Doug Ferguson was the president of the Liberal Party of Canada from 2008-2009.

Born to Ralph and Dolores Ferguson and raised on a farm near Watford, Ontario, he received a Bachelor of Commerce degree at the University of Ottawa and a law degree from the University of Western Ontario.

He was a lawyer for twenty years in London, Ontario practising civil litigation and estates before he joined the Faculty of Law, at the University of Western Ontario as an adjunct professor and as Director of Community Legal Services.  This legal clinic provides legal services to low income persons who cannot afford a lawyer.

In the community, Ferguson served as President of Covent Garden Market, and led this city-owned public market through the planning and constructing a new $17 million building. From 2004-2006 he served as a board member of Mission Services of London, a social agency providing assistance to the homeless.  From 2006-08, he was President of the Canadian Club of London, an organization dedicated to promoting patriotism and Canadian unity.  He also served as President of a local Optimist club and as a Lieutenant-Governor in the Optimist organization.

In the Liberal Party, Ferguson served as riding president for both the London West federal and provincial associations when Sue Barnes and Chris Bentley were elected as MP and MPP respectively.  He was campaign manager for Sue Barnes in London West and Glen Pearson in London North Centre when they first won office.

In 1994, Ferguson was elected as Vice President Organization for the Liberal Party of Canada (Ontario), and from 1998-2003 served as the National Organization Chair for the Liberal Party of Canada.  During his term he created Liberal University, a training program for grassroots Liberals. A few years later, at the Liberal leadership convention in December 2006, Ferguson was elected Vice President English Speaking of the Liberal Party of Canada.

In April 2008, he was elected as President of the Liberal Party of Canada by the party's national executive to replace Senator Marie Poulin after she resigned due to illness.  During his term as President, Ferguson oversaw changes to the party's governance, implemented a national party membership, co-chaired the Change Commission after the 2008 election, and promoted internal party reform, openness, and accountability.

In 2009, Ferguson was replaced by Alfred Apps as the president of the Liberal Party of Canada.

At a nomination meeting held on September 10, 2009, Ferguson was elected to stand as the Liberal candidate in the riding of London West. In the 2011 federal election, he was defeated by Conservative incumbent Ed Holder.

External links
Website

Living people
University of Ottawa alumni
University of Western Ontario alumni
Canadian lawyers
Academic staff of the University of Western Ontario
Presidents of the Liberal Party of Canada
Candidates in the 2011 Canadian federal election
People from Lambton County
Politicians from London, Ontario
Liberal Party of Canada candidates for the Canadian House of Commons
Year of birth missing (living people)